Acapulco International Airport, officially General Juan N. Álvarez International Airport , is the main airport of Acapulco, Guerrero, Mexico, located  from the city.

In 2020, the airport handled 395,948 passengers, and in 2021 it handled 670,239 passengers.

Information
Because Acapulco has always been considered an important resort and recreation area, Acapulco International Airport has long been important in the development of tourism in southern Mexico. It is the largest international airport in the country's southern Pacific region, and one of the largest air facilities in Mexico. Frequent flights are available daily from Mexico City International Airport in Mexico City as well as less frequent flights from other Mexican, American, and Canadian cities. The airport can accommodate jets up to the size of the Boeing 747.

This international airport is one of the top 15 airports in Mexico in terms of operations, receiving many international charter flights.

The facility has many services for passengers, including restaurants, VIP lounges, and several gates equipped with jetways, and is divided in two terminals, The Passenger terminal, serving all scheduled flight and all airlines (domestic and international) and the General Aviation terminal, which is a 1960s circular building.

The airport was named after Juan N. Álvarez Hurtado, a Mexican military officer who was instrumental in most of the armed conflicts in the beginning of Mexican independence, Governor of Guerrero and President of Mexico.

Terminal 
A new terminal was inaugurated by Mexican president Enrique Peña Nieto on 25 May 2018. The price was 547 million MXN. The terminal has 2 stories, has a capacity for 1.3 million people, and covers 18,800 m2. Some of the new features are new technology and more restaurants and shops. The construction lasted almost 2 years; from July 2016 to May 2018.

Airlines and destinations

Statistics

Passengers 

List of passengers per year since 2001.

Busiest routes

See also
List of the busiest airports in Mexico

References

External links
 Grupo Aeroportuario Centro Norte de México

Airports in Guerrero
Acapulco